Dubrave Gornje is a village in the municipality of Živinice, Bosnia and Herzegovina. It is the location of Tuzla International Airport.

Demographics 
According to the 2013 census, its population was 3,308.

References

Populated places in Živinice